

Most league goals

Most goals in a season

Most league appearances

Players

Youngest Player

Matt Edeson, 16 years & 63 days – Hull City vs Fulham – 10 October 1992

Oldest Player

Steve Harper, 40 years & 71 days – Hull City vs Manchester United – 24 May 2015

Oldest goal scorer

Dean Windass, 39 years & 235 days – Hull City v Portsmouth

Results

Biggest Victory

11–1 vs Carlisle United, Division 3, 14 January 1939

In Premier League (home):

6–0 vs Fulham, Premier League, 28 December 2013

In Premier League (away):

4–0 vs Cardiff City, Premier League, 22 February 2014

Biggest Defeat

0–8 vs Wolverhampton Wanderers, Division 2, 4 November 1911

0–8 vs Wigan Athletic, EFL Championship, 14 July 2020

Transfer fees

Paid

£13,000,000 – Ryan Mason from Tottenham Hotspur – 2016

£10,000,000 – Abel Hernández from Palermo – 2014 

£8,000,000 (reportedly) – Jake Livermore from Tottenham Hotspur – 2014 

£7,000,000 – Robert Snodgrass from Norwich City – 2014 

£6,000,000 (reportedly) (rising to £7,000,000) – Shane Long from West Bromwich Albion – 2014 & Nikica Jelavić from Everton – 2014 

£5,250,000 (reportedly) – Tom Huddlestone from Tottenham – 2013 

£5,000,000 – Jimmy Bullard from Fulham – 2009

£3,500,000 – Stephen Hunt from Reading – 2009 (undisclosed fee reportedly in the region of £3.5 million)

£3,000,000 – Seyi Olofinjana from Stoke City – 2009

£2,600,000 – Nick Proschwitz from Paderborn 07 – 2012 (€3.3 million)

£2,500,000 – Anthony Gardner from Tottenham Hotspur – 2008 (originally a loan with the option to sign permanently for a fee in the region of £2.5 million)

£2,500,000 – Kamil Zayatte from Young Boys – 2009 (undisclosed fee reported to equal the club's transfer record for Gardner)

£2,000,000 – Péter Halmosi from Plymouth Argyle – 2008 (undisclosed fee reportedly in the region of £2 million)

£1,800,000 – Steven Mouyokolo from Boulogne – 2009 (undisclosed fee reportedly in the region of  £1.8 million)

£1,700,000 – Kamel Ghilas from Celta Vigo – 2009 (undisclosed fee reportedly in the region of  £1.7 million)

£1,500,000 – Daniel Cousin from Rangers – 2008

£1,000,000 – Caleb Folan from Wigan Athletic – 2007

£500,000 – Dean Marney from Tottenham Hotspur – 2006 (undisclosed fee reported as £500,000 plus up to a further conditional £500,000)

Received

£22,000,000 – Jarrod Bowen to West Ham United – 2020

£17,000,000 – Harry Maguire to Leicester City – 2017

£12,500,000 – Shane Long to Southampton – 2014

£10,000,000 – Robert Snodgrass to West Ham – 2017

£10,000,000 – Jake Livermore to West Bromwich Albion – 2017

£8,000,000 – James Chester to West Bromwich Albion – 2015

£4,000,000 – Michael Turner to Sunderland – 2009

£2,000,000 – Sam Ricketts to Bolton Wanderers – 2009 (undisclosed fee reportedly in the region of £2–3 million)

£1,250,000 – Leon Cort to Crystal Palace – 2006

£1,000,000 – Craig Fagan to Derby County – 2007 (£750,000 plus a further £250,000 due to promotion)

£900,000 (reported) – Jack Hobbs to Nottingham Forest – 2014 

£750,000 – Andy Payton to Middlesbrough – 1991

£700,000 – Dean Windass to Aberdeen – 1995

References

Records
Hull City